Isparta is an electoral district of the Grand National Assembly of Turkey. It elects four members of parliament (deputies) to represent the province of the same name for a four-year term by the D'Hondt method, a party-list proportional representation system.

Members 
Population reviews of each electoral district are conducted before each general election, which can lead to certain districts being granted a smaller or greater number of parliamentary seats.

Isparta returned four MPs during the 1999 parliamentary election. five MPs during the parliamentary elections in 2002 and 2007. In 2011, the number of seats again fell to four.

Isparta is famous for being the constituency from which Süleyman Demirel, the 12th Prime Minister of Turkey and the 9th President of Turkey, was elected to parliament as leader of the Justice Party and later the True Path Party during the 1960-90s.

General elections

2015

2011

Presidential elections

2014

References 

Electoral districts of Turkey
Politics of Isparta Province